The Cool Voice of Rita Reys is the debut album by Dutch jazz singer Rita Reys which features sessions recorded with bands led by drummers Wessel Ilcken and Art Blakey divided over each side of the original LP which was released on the Dutch Philips and US Columbia labels.

Reception
Allmusic stated "In 1956 Reys recorded probably her most famous album, The Cool Voice of Rita Reys. Her backup band was Art Blakey & the Jazz Messengers. Reys and Ilcken spent a few months in the United States during 1956–1957. She had opportunities to sing not only with Blakey but Jimmy Smith, Chico Hamilton, Clark Terry, and Mat Mathews".

Track listing 
 "It's All Right with Me" (Cole Porter) – 2:37
 "Gone with the Wind" (Allie Wrubel, Herb Magidson) – 2:35
 "My Funny Valentine" (Lorenz Hart, Richard Rodgers) – 2:59
 "But Not for Me" (George Gershwin, Ira Gershwin" – 2:09
 "I Should Care" (Axel Stordahl, Paul Weston, Sammy Cahn) – 2:38
 "There Will Never Be Another You" (Harry Warren, Mack Gordon) – 2:27
 "I Cried for You" (Gus Arnheim, Arthur Freed, Abe Lyman) – 3:30
 "You'd Be So Nice to Come Home To" (Porter) – 3:36
 "My One and Only Love" (Guy Wood, Robert Mellin) – 4:14
 "That Old Black Magic" (Harold Arlen, Johnny Mercer) – 2:56
 "Spring Will Be a Little Late This Year" (Frank Loesser) – 3:41
 "Taking a Chance on Love" (Vernon Duke, John La Touche, Ted Fetter) – 2:34
Recorded at Phonogram Studios in Hilversum, Holland on January 17, 1955 (track 3), August 16, 1955 (tracks 5 & 6), and February 16, 1956 (tracks 1, 2 & 4), and in New York City on May 3, 1956 (tracks 7, 8, 10 & 12) and June 25, 1956 (tracks 9 & 11)

Personnel 
Rita Reys – vocals
Donald Byrd (tracks 7–12), Ack Van Rooyen (tracks 1, 2 & 4), Gerard Van Rooyen (tracks 5 & 6) – trumpet
Dick Bezemer – trombone (track 3)
Hank Mobley (tracks 7, 8, 10 & 12), Ira Sullivan (tracks 9 & 11), Toon Van Vliet (track 3, 5 & 6) – tenor saxophone
Herman Schoonderwalt – baritone saxophone (tracks 1, 2 & 4)
Kenny Drew (tracks 9 & 11), Rob Madna (tracks 1, 2 & 4–6), Horace Silver (tracks 7, 8, 10 & 12), Gerard Van Rooyen (track 3) – piano
Chris Bender (track 3), Dick Bezemer (tracks 1, 2 & 4–6), Wilbur Ware (tracks 9 & 11), Doug Watkins (tracks 7, 8, 10 & 12) – bass
Art Blakey (tracks 7–12), Wessel Ilcken (tracks 1–6) – drums

References 

Rita Reys albums
Art Blakey albums
1956 debut albums
Columbia Records albums
Philips Records albums
Albums produced by George Avakian